Johnny Golding (also known as Sue Golding) is Professor of Philosophy & Fine Art, and senior tutor at the Royal College of Art, London, UK. Golding's work deals with the onto-epistemological nuances of radical matter: artificial and distributed intelligence, embodiment, and the ethical-political. Golding is Philosopher-in-Residence at the Royal Academy, London (2019). Golding also leads the PHD Research Lab: Entanglement, which includes 25 PHD researchers; co-led with artist Meg Rahaim. Most recently the lab-produced: 'Entanglement: Just Gaming' - a mixed-media approach to consciousness, poetics, warfare, and risk set across several social platforms (including Vimeo, SoundCloud, YouTube, TikTok, Instagram). From 2012-16, Johnny was Director of the Centre for Fine Art Research (CFAR) at Birmingham School of Art (Birmingham City University), and from 2009-2012 Director of the Institute for the Converging Arts and Sciences (ICAS) at the University of Greenwich and Head of Theory at the Jan van Eyck Akademie in Maastricht (1998–2003)..

Personal life and work

Born in New York, Golding lived in Toronto where she completed her PhD in political philosophy at the University of Toronto, concurrently studying under the tutelage of Michel Foucault, Ernesto Laclau, and from 1980-84 under the guidance of Raymond Williams at Cambridge University. She was the founding President of Buddies in Bad Times Theatre, the first LGBT theatre company in Canada, whose humble start began in local community centres and, as importantly, local porn houses, with the first show, Drag Queens in Outer Space (written and directed by Sky Gilbert) helped shape the political agenda of gay/lesbian politics for several generations. of Buddies in Bad Times Theatre from 1983 to 1995. She was a regular contributor to The Body Politic, a monthly magazine that played a key role in the LGBT community in Canada.

In 1994 Golding moved to Soho, London. She has written and edited several books including Gramsci's Democratic Theory, The Eight Technologies of Otherness,  and On the Verge of Photography. She produces public lectures presented in the form of sound/image installations, often in complete darkness. Head of theory at the experimental post-academic institute, the Jan van Eyck (Maastricht) from 1998-2003, working with artist Steve McQueen, art historian Norman Bryson and philosopher-artist Sarat Marharaj.

References

External links 

 Johnny Golding on Academia.edu

Living people
People from New York (state)
American philosophers
1964 births